Jonathan Ward is a paralympic athlete from Great Britain competing mainly in category F13 throwing events.

Jonathan competed in four Paralympic Games, firstly in 1988 where he won a gold in the B3 shot put, a silver in the B3 discus and bronze in the B3 pentathlon as well as competing in the javelin.  In the 1992 Summer Paralympics he won a silver in his only even the B3 shot put.  In Atlanta he failed to win a medal for the first time despite competing in the F12 discus, F12 shot put and as part of the T10-12 4 × 100 m relay team.  He was back to winning medals in Sydney in the 2000 Summer Paralympics when he won a bronze in the F13 shot put as well as competing in the F13 discus.

References

Paralympic athletes of Great Britain
Athletes (track and field) at the 1988 Summer Paralympics
Athletes (track and field) at the 1992 Summer Paralympics
Athletes (track and field) at the 2000 Summer Paralympics
Paralympic gold medalists for Great Britain
Paralympic silver medalists for Great Britain
Paralympic bronze medalists for Great Britain
Living people
Year of birth missing (living people)
Medalists at the 1988 Summer Paralympics
Medalists at the 1992 Summer Paralympics
Medalists at the 2000 Summer Paralympics
Paralympic medalists in athletics (track and field)
British male discus throwers
British male shot putters
British pentathletes
Visually impaired discus throwers
Visually impaired shot putters
Paralympic discus throwers
Paralympic shot putters